The 1967 Troy State Red Wave football team represented Troy State University (now known as Troy University) as a member of the Alabama Collegiate Conference (ACC) during the 1967 NAIA football season. Led by second-year head coach Billy Atkins, the Red Wave compiled an overall record of 8–2 with a mark of 3–0 in conference play, winning the ACC title.

Schedule

References

Troy State
Troy Trojans football seasons
Alabama Collegiate Conference football champion seasons
Troy State Red Wave football